"Revolution Love" is a song by Australian pop/new wave group Kids in the Kitchen. The song was released in November 1987 as the third and final single from their second studio album, Terrain (1987). The song peaked at number 44 on the Australian Kent Music Report. It was the band's final release before they disbanded.

Track listing 
7" (K-459) 
Side A "Revolution Love" 
Side B "Cry"

12" (X13300)
Side A "Revolution Love" (The Wall Street Crash Mix) - 6:37
Side B1 "Revolution Love" (Slash & Textured Dub Mix)
Side B2 "Revolution Love" (Percussive Edits)

Charts

References 

1987 songs
1987 singles
Kids in the Kitchen songs
Mushroom Records singles